Linda Howlett Belcher (born September 28, 1948) is an American educator and politician. She is a three-time member of the Kentucky House of Representatives, representing the 49th district, which covers parts of Bullitt County.

Early life and education 
Belcher was born in Shepherdsville, Kentucky. She received a Bachelor of Arts degree in elementary education from Eastern Kentucky University and a Master of Arts in elementary education from Western Kentucky University.

Career 
Outside of politics, Belcher worked as an elementary teacher and was a member of the Little Flock Christian Academy School Board. Belcher served in the Kentucky House of Representatives from 2009 to 2013 and from 2015 to 2017 as a Democrat. She succeeded her husband Larry Belcher in the Kentucky General Assembly after he was killed in an auto accident.

In 2016, Belcher was defeated for re-election by Republican Dan Johnson. Johnson committed suicide in December 2017, two days after elements of his criminal past had been exposed. Belcher ran again for the open seat in a district which president Donald Trump had won with 72% of the vote. Dan's widow, Rebecca, was chosen by Republican officials as their replacement nominee, to oppose Belcher in a special election. Belcher recaptured her old seat with 68% of the vote. She lost to Republican Thomas Huff in the general election of November 2018.

Election results

Notes

1948 births
Living people
People from Shepherdsville, Kentucky
Western Kentucky University alumni
Eastern Kentucky University alumni
Educators from Kentucky
Kentucky women in education
Women state legislators in Kentucky
School board members in Kentucky
Democratic Party members of the Kentucky House of Representatives
21st-century American women